The Age of Innocence is a 1924 American silent film directed by Wesley Ruggles. It is the first film adaptation of Edith Wharton's 1920 novel The Age of Innocence.  It was produced and distributed by Warner Brothers.

Plot
Newland Archer is engaged to May Mingott of a prominent New York family.  Shortly after the engagement is announced, Newland finds himself attracted to May's older married cousin Countess Ellen Olenska.  After his marriage to May, Newland and Ellen agree to run away together.  Before this can happen, May visits her husband's lover and informs her that she is expecting a child.  Ellen and Newland part ways, Newland vowing to be a better husband to his wife May.

Cast
 Beverly Bayne as Countess Ellen Olanska
 Edith Roberts as May Mingott
 Elliott Dexter as Newland Archer
 Willard Louis as Cornelius Beaufort
 Fred Huntley 
 Gertrude Norman
 Sigrid Holmquist

Preservation status
This film is now lost. In February 1956, Jack Warner sold the rights to all of his pre-December 1949 films to Associated Artists Productions. 
In 1969, UA donated 16mm prints of some Warner Bros. films from outside United States. No copies of The Age of Innocence are known to exist.

Legacy
In 1928, Margaret Ayer Barnes adapted the novel into a play, first produced on Broadway, starring Katharine Cornell as Countess Ellen Olenska.
In 1934 an adaptation of the novel was directed by Philip Moeller. It was released by RKO Radio Pictures and stars Irene Dunne as Countess Ellen Olenska, John Boles as Newland Archer, Julie Haydon as May Welland Archer, Lionel Atwill, and Helen Westley.
In 1993 an adaptation of the novel was directed by Martin Scorsese. It was released by Columbia Pictures and stars Michelle Pfeiffer as Countess Ellen Olenska, Daniel Day-Lewis as Newland Archer, Winona Ryder as May Welland Archer, Richard E. Grant, and Miriam Margolyes. Ryder won a Golden Globe Award for her portrayal of May Welland Archer, and the film won an Oscar for costume design.

References

External links
 
 
 
 

1924 films
American silent feature films
American black-and-white films
Lost American films
Films based on American novels
Films based on works by Edith Wharton
Films directed by Wesley Ruggles
Films set in the 19th century
1920s historical films
American historical films
Films set in New York City
Warner Bros. films
1924 lost films
1920s American films